is a Japanese musician, composer, and actor who is represented by the talent agency Kakubarhythm. He played the trombone in the band Sakerock.

Filmography

TV dramas

Video on demand

Film

Video games

Dubbing
Soul, Joe Gardner

References

1981 births
21st-century Japanese male actors
21st-century Japanese musicians
21st-century Japanese male musicians
Japanese male composers
Japanese male film actors
Japanese male television actors
Living people
Musicians from Yokohama